Westlands Sports Ground is a former List A cricket ground located in Yeovil, Somerset.  The ground is home to Westlands Sports Club, originally formed from employees of Westland Aircraft.  Between 1971 and 1978, the ground hosted annual Somerset County Cricket Club matches in late May or early June.  In later years, the club has used the ground for Second XI and youth cricket.

References

External links
 Ground Profile at CricketArchive
 Ground Profile at Cricinfo

Cricket grounds in Somerset
Sports venues in Yeovil
Sports venues completed in 1944